Kadoka is a city in, and the county seat of, Jackson County, South Dakota, United States. The population was 543 at the 2020 census. The town occupies about 2.3 square miles.

History
Kadoka got its start in 1906 when the Chicago, Milwaukee, St. Paul and Pacific Railroad was extended to that point. The town was designated county seat of the newly formed Jackson County in 1915.

Geography and climate
Kadoka is located at  (43.835290, -101.512333).

Kadoka has been assigned the ZIP code 57543 and the FIPS place code 33180.

Demographics

2010 census
As of the census of 2010, there were 654 people, 291 households, and 160 families residing in the city. The racial makeup of the city was 81.2% White, 0.5% African American, 13.3% Native American, and 5.0% from two or more races. Hispanic or Latino of any race were 0.2% of the population.

There were 291 households, of which 27.8% had children under the age of 18 living with them, 39.9% were married couples living together, 10.0% had a female householder with no husband present, 5.2% had a male householder with no wife present, and 45.0% were non-families. 40.5% of all households were made up of individuals, and 19.6% had someone living alone who was 65 years of age or older. The average household size was 2.17 and the average family size was 2.94.

The median age in the city was 44.5 years. 24.9% of residents were under the age of 18; 6.1% were between the ages of 18 and 24; 19.4% were from 25 to 44; 25.1% were from 45 to 64; and 24.5% were 65 years of age or older. The gender makeup of the city was 46.9% male and 53.1% female.

2000 census
As of the census of 2000, there were 706 people, 293 households, and 172 families residing in the city. The population density was 305.0 people per square mile (118.0/km2). There were 356 housing units at an average density of 153.8 per square mile (59.5/km2). The racial makeup of the city was 83.99% White, 0.14% African American, 13.03% Native American, 0.14% Asian, 0.14% from other races, and 2.55% from two or more races. Hispanic or Latino of any race were 0.28% of the population.

There were 293 households, out of which 29.4% had children under the age of 18 living with them, 48.8% were married couples living together, 9.6% had a female householder with no husband present, and 41.0% were non-families. 35.5% of all households were made up of individuals, and 20.1% had someone living alone who was 65 years of age or older. The average household size was 2.33 and the average family size was 3.11.

In the city, the population was spread out, with 27.6% under the age of 18, 5.8% from 18 to 24, 21.4% from 25 to 44, 22.4% from 45 to 64, and 22.8% who were 65 years of age or older. The median age was 42 years. For every 100 females, there were 86.3 males. For every 100 females age 18 and over, there were 80.6 males.

The median income for a household in the city was $26,875, and the median income for a family was $31,167. Males had a median income of $26,818 versus $18,750 for females. The per capita income for the city was $13,758. About 10.5% of families and 13.8% of the population were below the poverty line, including 22.0% of those under age 18 and 13.4% of those age 65 or over.

Kadoka Airport
The City of Kadoka owns and operates the Kadoka airport. The airport has two turf runways. It is not entirely fenced so pedestrian traffic may approach the taxiways. The airport is located in the eastern part of the town near the Kadoka school athletic facilities.

Depot Museum

The town has a museum that occupies the building that used to be the train station.  It is only open from 6 p.m. to 8 p.m. on certain days of the week.

See also
 List of cities in South Dakota

References

External links

Cities in South Dakota
Cities in Jackson County, South Dakota
County seats in South Dakota